Ang, ANG or Äng may refer to:

Initials
 Air National Guard, part of the United States National Guard
 Angiogenin, a protein encoded by the ANG gene
 Angmering railway station, National Rail code for a station in the United Kingdom
 Australian National Gallery, now the National Gallery of Australia
 Adsorbed natural gas, a methane storage technique 
 Animated Network Graphics, properly APNG, a variant of PNG
 Union of Agriculture, Food and Allied Industries, a former Austrian trade union

Codes
 ANG, Angola's IOC and licence plate country codes
 Netherlands Antillean guilder by ISO 4217 currency code
 Ang, the ISO 639 language code for Old English, or Anglo-Saxon (Ænglisc)

Companies
 ANG Newspapers, a newspaper publisher

Names
 Ang (surname), a common Hokkien and Teochew surname
 Kings of Cambodia
Ponhea Chan, reign name Ang Chan I (r. 1516–1566)
Ang Chan II, reign name Outey Reachea III (r. 1796–1806 under regency; 1806–1835)
Ang Tong Reachea, born Ponhea Nou (r. 1631–1640)
Batom Reachea, born Ang Non (r. 1640–1642)
Barom Reachea V, born Ang So (r. 1658–1672)
Preah Keo II, born Ang Chee (r. 1673–1674)
Batom Reachea III, born Ang Nan (r. 1674)
Chey Chettha IV, born Ang Sor (r. 1675–1695, 1696–1699, 1700–1702, 1703–1706)
Outey I, born Ang Yong (r. 1695–1696)
Barom Reameathiptei, born Ang Em (r. 1699–1700, 1710–1722)
Thommo Reachea III, born Ang Tham (r. 1702–1703, 1706–1709, 1736–1747)
Satha II, born  Ang Chey (r. 1722–1736, 1749)
Thommo Reachea IV, born Ang Em (r. 1747)
Reameathiptei III, born Ang Tong (r. 1748–1749, 1755–1758)
Chey Chettha V, born Ang Snguon (r. 1749–1755)
Outey Reachea II, born Ang Ton (r. 1758–1775)
Ream Reachea, born Ang Non II (r. 1775–1779)
Neareay Reachea III, born Ang Eng (r. 1779–1782, 1794–1796)
Ang Mey, born Ksat Trey (r. 1834–1841)
Harihak Reamea Issarathiptei, born Ang Duong (r. 1841–1860)

Popular culture
 Ang 5.0, Angela Chang's fifth Chinese album
 Big Ang (TV series), an American reality television program starring Angela "Big Ang" Raiola
 Mr. Ang, the protagonist of The Alien
 ANG, Mexican DJ duo published mainly by Revealed Recordings and Maxximize Records

Others
 Used for the Sikh scripture Guru Granth Sahib meaning limb instead of the referral of page numbers.
 Anga, Ang Desh or Ang Mahajanapada, one of the 16 Mahajanapada of Ancient India
 Angiopoietin, in biochemistry
 Ang, the abbreviation for the orchid genus Anguloa
 Äng, a locality in Nässjö Municipality, Sweden

See also 
 Aang, main character of Avatar: The Last Airbender, an animated television series on Nickelodeon